From List of National Natural Landmarks, these are the National Natural Landmarks in Nebraska.  There are 5 in total

Nebraska
National Natural Landmarks